Sinéad Noonan (born 1987) is an Irish former model and actress who won Miss Ireland 2008.

Noonan was born in Dublin to Peter and Stephanie Noonan, and grew up in Dunboyne, Meath.  She attended St. Peter's College where she excelled in drama, and now holds a qualification  in Speech and Drama, as well as a certificate in Advance Acting, and speaks English.

In 2008, Noonan represented Meath at Miss Ireland in Dublin where judges included music manager Louis Walsh, actor Matt Di Angelo, and former Miss Ireland Pamela Flood,  and emerged winner. Her victory enabled her to represent her country at Miss World where she made the top ten in the talent competition.

Noonan, who appeared in several plays and short films, cited Halle Berry as her role model,  and originally planned to open a Drama school and become an actress, but later launched a modelling career. Represented by Compton Model Agency and Assets, Noonan became the face of Lipsey’s Autumn/Winter 2008 collection and Gillian Hughes hats. In 2009, Noonan told the Sunday Mirror she would welcome offers to pose nude, provided it was tasteful. 

Noonan has lived in Dubai whilst working for Emirates has also lived in London. Noonan has since retired from modelling, and currently resides in Ireland where she is a mother of one.

References

Miss World 2008 delegates
1987 births
Living people
Irish female models
Actors from County Meath
Miss Ireland winners
Beauty pageant contestants from Ireland
Models from Dublin (city)